Virden may refer to:

People
Claude Virden (born 1947), American basketball player

Places

Canada
Virden, Manitoba

United States
Virden, Illinois
Virden Township, Illinois
Virden, New Mexico
Virden-Patton House, historic house in Mississippi